The 2011 Chinese Grand Prix (formally the 2011 Formula 1 UBS Chinese Grand Prix) was a Formula One motor race held on 17 April 2011 at the Shanghai International Circuit in Shanghai, People's Republic of China. It was the third round of the 2011 Formula One season. The 56-lap race was won by McLaren driver Lewis Hamilton after starting from third on the grid, also becoming the first ever multiple winner of the Chinese Grand Prix. Sebastian Vettel finished second in a Red Bull Racing, having started from pole position, and teammate Mark Webber completed the podium, in third place having started eighteenth.

As a consequence of the race, Vettel's lead in the World Drivers' Championship was cut to 21 points by Hamilton, who moved into second place in the championship. Hamilton's McLaren teammate Jenson Button, who finished fourth in China, fell 9 points behind Hamilton in third, a single point ahead of Webber. In the World Constructors' Championship, Red Bull's championship lead was also cut from 24 points to 20 by McLaren, with Ferrari a further 35 points behind in third position after drivers Felipe Massa and Fernando Alonso finished in sixth and seventh places respectively.

Report

Background
Heading into the race, Sebastian Vettel led the Championship on the maximum 50 points after winning the first two races. Jenson Button was in second place in the standings after a 2nd and a 6th that put him on 26 points - just over half Vettel's total, and almost a race win behind. The other McLaren of Lewis Hamilton and yet to reach the podium, Mark Webber, were third and fourth respectively, both on 22 points. Fernando Alonso was fifth with 20 points, followed by Heidfeld on 17, Massa on 16 and Petrov on 15. In both races thus far in 2011 the podium had featured Vettel as the winner, a McLaren in second place and a Renault in third.

Tyre supplier Pirelli brought its silver-banded hard compound tyre as the harder "prime" tyre and the yellow-banded soft compound as the softer "option" compound. This was the same tyre selection that Bridgestone had chosen bring to the Chinese Grand Prix for the previous year.

In the Constructors' table, Red Bull Racing led with 72 points, one and a half times McLaren's score (48), and double Ferrari's (36). Despite having two podiums, Renault were still behind Ferrari; but only just - with 30 points - and were putting up a good fight for the time being. Sauber were fifth in the standings, with 6 points, Toro Rosso and Force India had 4, and Mercedes had 2. By this point of the season, Williams were yet to finish a race.

Qualifying

Sebastian Vettel took a comfortable pole position in qualifying, with the second placed Jenson Button 0.7 seconds behind him and Button's McLaren teammate Lewis Hamilton in third. Mark Webber had a torrid session, eliminated in the first part of qualifying after electrical problems in the earlier free practice, placing him 18th on the starting grid.

Nico Rosberg in his Mercedes found himself fourth, Rosberg also recorded the fastest time of the first part of the qualifying session. Behind him were the Ferraris of Alonso and Massa, who had been unable to keep up with the pace of Red Bull or McLaren, Alonso recording a time almost a second off Vettel's pole position lap. Vitaly Petrov recorded a time in part two that got him through to the final part of qualifying, however, his car developed problems and stopped on the track, meaning he was unable to take part in the final session and would take the tenth place on the grid.

Race

Lewis Hamilton faced a stressful situation just minutes before the start of the race; a fuel problem with his car meant that if he had started his journey to the grid just 35 seconds later, he would have had to start from the pit-lane. Hamilton however, went on to a thrilling  three-stop race, overtaking his two-stopping rival and World Drivers' Championship leader Sebastian Vettel on lap 52 of the 56 lap race. Vettel had had a poor start to his race, being beaten on the first lap by both McLarens, with Jenson Button initially holding the upper hand, but his teammate Hamilton putting in a series of fastest laps that would ultimately give him victory to Button's fourth-place finish. Also Hamilton performed an overtake on his teammate in Turn 1, about the midpoint of the race to take second place.

Mark Webber drove a spectacular race from 18th on the starting grid to bring his Red Bull to the chequered flag in 3rd position, beating Jenson Button for the final podium place on only the last lap. Button had made a terrible mistake on the 15th lap when bringing his car into the pits, stopping in the Red Bull pit before being waved off by the Red Bull mechanics into his own McLaren pit one place ahead. The mistake cost Button time, as it did for Sebastian Vettel who was also coming into the pits and had to wait behind Button for him to realise his error; although Button entered the pits in the lead, but exited behind Vettel. Jaime Alguersuari lost a wheel on his exit from the pits on lap 10, forcing his retirement from the race. He was the race's only retirement, meaning that this race set the record for the most finishers (23). The record was beaten later in the season, in Valencia, where all 24 starters finished the race.

The race cut Sebastian Vettel's championship lead to 21 points from second placed Lewis Hamilton, with Red Bull constructors lead to McLaren falling to 20 points. Hamilton was ecstatic after his victory, saying "It was one of the best races I've experienced. It feels amazing to be able to bring home a victory for the guys in the factory."

Classification

Qualifying

Notes
 – Vitaly Petrov stopped on track during Q2. While the lap time he posted managed to get him into Q3, he was not able to take further part in the qualifying session.

Race

Championship standings after the race 

Drivers' Championship standings

Constructors' Championship standings

 Note: Only the top five positions are included for both sets of standings.

References

External links

Chinese Grand Prix
China
Grand Prix
Chinese Grand Prix